The Minnesota State High School Mathematics League is a high school mathematics league in the state of Minnesota.  It was founded in 1980 by Macalester College professor Wayne Roberts. The league holds five statewide tournaments per year from November through February, as well as a state tournament in March. It is one of the Minnesota Mathematics Competitions.

Regular season 
There are five meets for each regular season. For each meet, there are four individual events, A-D. Each mathlete chooses to compete in two individual events. Each high school chooses its eight top mathletes, including at least two students below the eleventh grade, as its "varsity" team, which actually earns points in the name of the school and competes together in the team event; the other students simply compete for themselves in whichever two individual events they choose.  Each individual event contains one one point question and three two point questions, so the maximum a person may score per meet is fourteen points.  The team events each contain six questions worth four points each.  A team's total score is determined by adding the individual scores of the varsity members and the varsity team score.  At the end of the season, teams are selected for the state tournament based on their season score.

State tournament 

The state tournament begins with the Invitational event. The Invitational is a 14-question test (with a maximum score of 24) taken by the top 50 students in the regular season. Later during the day, students participate in a meet that is structured like the regular-season meets (with a maximum score of 14). The combined total score of these two events determines the champion of the state tournament.

Math Bowl 

The Math Bowl brings together the top 10 scorers from the Invitational event, and they compete live onstage, solving eight problems one at a time with a limited amount of time for each problem. The person who solves the most questions is declared the Math Bowl champion. If there is a tie after eight questions, sudden death ensues, in which everyone tied with the highest score remains onstage. They remain onstage until they miss a question someone else got correctly. The last participant remaining is declared the champion. However, should multiple people remain onstage after 14 total questions, the procedure is changed for the 15th (last) question. To ensure that only one person wins the Math Bowl, only the person who correctly answers the 15th question first is declared the champion.

Stan Hill Memorial Award 

The combined total score of the regular season and state tournament determines the top all-around individual and the Stan Hill Memorial Award winner.

Past winners 

The league officially recognizes individual and team winners of two types each season, one with the highest overall regular season score, and one with the highest state tournament score. The league also crowns one math bowl winner each season. Since the 1988-89 season, the league has recognized an additional Tier 2 state tournament winner among smaller schools, with larger schools designated as Tier 1. 

Beginning with the 2019-20 season, a weighted scoring system known as "Power Points" was used to rank the top individuals. Team scores continued to use the standard scoring format.

All-state math teams 
The Minnesota State High School Mathematics League sponsors the Minnesota All-State Mathematics Teams, which compete annually at ARML (American Regions Mathematics League), HMMT (Harvard-MIT Mathematics Tournament) and some other college math competitions. Selection is based on the math league regular season and state tournament scores and American Mathematics Competitions scores. The MN All-State Gold Team is the first team, consisting of 15 students for ARML and 8 students for HMMT. Traditionally MN All-State Math Teams have had many successes in these national competitions.

References

External links 
Minnesota State High School Math League web page
List of Mathematics Competitions in Minnesota
Mathematics competitions
Education in Minnesota
Organizations based in Minnesota
Minnesota State High School League